Arzoo Hai Tu is an Indian television series produced by Ramanand Sagar of Sagar Arts Limited, which aired on Sahara One channel. The series premiered on 1 September 2003.

Cast
Mohnish Behl
Aman Verma
Mrinal Kulkarni
Lata Sabharwal
Uday Tikekar
Shital Thakkar
Sudha Shivpuri

References

Sahara One original programming
Indian drama television series
2003 Indian television series debuts